Wallace Harry Graham (October 9, 1910January 8, 1996) was the Physician to the President (1945-1953) during the presidency of Harry S. Truman. In April 1950 President Truman sent Graham with a medical team to visit and assist King Ibn Saud, who, among other things, suffered from severe arthritis. The response from Riyadh was favorable, and the visit helped cement relations between the United States and the Saudi kingdom, which had been strained by the US recognition of Israel.

References

1910 births
1996 deaths
United States Air Force generals
Recipients of the Legion of Merit
United States Army Air Forces personnel of World War II
Physicians to the President
People from Doniphan County, Kansas
Military personnel from Kansas
Physicians from Kansas
Truman administration personnel
United States Army Air Forces officers